The Alan Turing Memorial, situated in Sackville Gardens in Manchester, England, is a sculpture in memory of Alan Turing, a pioneer of modern computing. 

Turing is believed to have taken his own life in 1954, two years after being convicted of gross indecency (i.e. homosexual acts). As such, he is as much a gay icon as an icon of computing, and the memorial is situated near to Canal Street, Manchester's gay village.

Turing is depicted sitting on a bench situated in a central position in the park, holding an apple. On Turing's left is the University of Manchester and on his right is Canal Street. Sculptor Glyn Hughes said the park was chosen as the location for the statue because "It's got the university science buildings...on one side and it's got all the gay bars on the other side, where apparently he spent most of his evenings." 

The statue was unveiled on 23 June, Turing's birthday, in 2001. It was conceived by Richard Humphry, a barrister from Stockport, who set up the Alan Turing Memorial Fund in order to raise the necessary funds. Humphry had come up with the idea of a statue after seeing Hugh Whitemore's play Breaking the Code, starring Derek Jacobi. Jacobi became the patron of the fund. Glyn Hughes, an industrial sculptor from Adlington near Westhoughton, was commissioned to sculpt the statue. 

Roy Jackson (who had previously raised funds for HIV/AIDS and Gay Awareness in Manchester) was asked to assist in the funding raising to make the memorial happen.  Within 12 months, through donations and a "village lottery", £15,000 was raised. It would have cost  £50,000 would have been needed to cast the statue at a British foundry, and so it was instead cast by the Tianjin Focus Company in China.

The inscription in relief on the cast bronze bench reads "Alan Mathison Turing 1912–1954" and "IEKYF ROMSI ADXUO KVKZC GUBJ". The latter is described by Glyn Hughes as "a motto as encoded by the German 'Enigma'". The original message is often given as "Founder of Computer Science", however this is unlikely as the Enigma ciphering system does not allow a letter to be enciphered to itself, while the fourteenth letter of that message (the "U" in "Computer") is the same as the fourteenth letter of the encoded inscription.

A plaque at the statue's feet reads "Father of Computer Science, Mathematician, Logician, Wartime Codebreaker, Victim of Prejudice", followed by the Bertrand Russell quotation "Mathematics, rightly viewed, possesses not only truth but supreme beauty, a beauty cold and austere like that of sculpture." Glyn Hughes buried his own old Amstrad computer beneath the statue, in tribute to Turing.

Gallery

See also
 2001 in art
 Alan Turing statue (2007), Bletchley Park, England
 Alan Turing sculpture (1988), Eugene, Oregon
 List of LGBT monuments and memorials

References

2001 sculptures
2001 establishments in England
Cultural depictions of Alan Turing
Bronze sculptures in the United Kingdom
LGBT history in the United Kingdom
LGBT monuments and memorials in Europe
Monuments and memorials in Manchester
Outdoor sculptures in England
Statues in England
Tourist attractions in Manchester